Petronella of Courtrai (Petronille) (? — after 1214) was a Dutch regent and noblewoman.  She ruled during the absence of her husband and after he died, during the minority of her son. 

She was a daughter of a woman named Sarah and her husband, lord Roger I of Courtrai.

Petronella was a wife of Lord Zeger II and with him, mother of:
Zeger III of Ghent
Daniel
Arnold
Gilles (he was married and he fathered a son named Arnold) 
Dirk
Bernhard
Walter (Woutre) 
Beatrix

Her husband Zeger II was a templar from 1200 and in 1202 he died, and she continued as regent for their son Zeger. She remained influential after her son took over the government and donated some lands to an abbey. When signing documents she used the titulature of Burgravine.

References

Year of birth unknown
13th-century women of the Holy Roman Empire
13th-century women rulers